The Richard A. Handlon Correctional Facility (MTU), located in Ionia, Michigan, named after the prison's first warden, is a facility for male offenders who are, on average, younger than most other prisoners.

Programming

Six vocational courses are offered: building trades, machine shop, welding, horticulture, auto mechanics and auto body reconditioning. Adult Basic Education and General Education Development completion are offered.

Religious services, counseling and psychotherapy and other programs are offered. Job skills, life skills, and prevocational counseling are also offered, as well as a program for anger control.

Prisoners are provided on-site routine medical and dental care. Serious problems are treated at the department's Duane L. Waters Hospital in Jackson, and emergencies can be referred to a local hospital.

Security
A double fence, razor-ribbon wire and electronic detection systems make up the perimeter. A patrol vehicle enhances perimeter security.

See also

 List of Michigan state prisons

References

1958 establishments in Michigan
Prisons in Michigan
Buildings and structures in Ionia County, Michigan